Adam James Watts (born 4 March 1988) is an English former professional footballer who played as a defender.

He came through the youth academy at Fulham before going on to play in the Football League for Milton Keynes Dons, Northampton Town and Lincoln City. He ended his career in non-league football with spells at Gainsborough Trinity and Eastbourne Borough.

Career

Fulham
Watts began his professional career at Fulham; however, he never went on to make a first team appearance for Fulham. In 2007, Watts signed his first professional contract with Fulham. Yet, in the League Cup match against Shrewsbury Town, he was an unused substitute. He made a league appearance during a loan spell with Milton Keynes Dons in Football League Two. On 10 September 2008, Watts signed a new contract with Fulham that will keep him at the club until the summer of 2010. In April 2009 he signed for League One side Northampton Town, on loan until the end of the season. He made a handful of appearances, but could not prevent Northampton being relegated, before he returned to Fulham. After starting the 2009/10 season in Fulham's first team squad, making the bench against CSKA Sofia and Manchester City, he departed the club.

Lincoln City
On 2 October 2009 he agreed to join Lincoln City on an initial month's loan, becoming newly installed managed Chris Sutton's first signing for the club. He made his debut in the club's 1–0 home victory over Aldershot Town the following day and, after helping his side to two clean sheets in his first two games, his loan was extended until 2 January 2010. Having impressed during his loan period, on 31 December 2009 the club announced that Watts had agreed terms on a permanent contract with the Imps that will run until the summer of 2012, joining for an undisclosed fee; the paperwork being completed on 5 January 2010. On 20 February 2010 his season was ended when he suffered a fracture of his left fibula in the 2–2 draw at Grimsby Town, the injury seeing him undergo surgery to pin the fracture. The following season, he returned to the side and scored his first and only goal for the club in a 4–3 win at Stockport County.

In May 2011, he was made available on a free transfer by the club, after a mass clear out of players following relegation from the Football League. On 27 December 2011 he departed Sincil Bank by mutual consent.

Gainsborough Trinity
Watts signed with Conference North side Gainsborough Trinity on 6 January 2012 He was amongst the Trinity side that missed out on promotion to the Conference National after defeat to Nuneaton Town in the play-off final. He was released with three other players on 18 May 2012.

Eastbourne Borough
Watts signed for Eastbourne Borough of the Conference South in October 2012. He received the Manager's player and the Player's player of the year awards in his first season at the club, making 29 appearances in all competitions (26 league). On 26 November 2015, he decided to take a break from the game to allow himself to recover from recurring injury problems.

References

External links

1988 births
Living people
Footballers from the London Borough of Hackney
English footballers
Association football defenders
Fulham F.C. players
Milton Keynes Dons F.C. players
Northampton Town F.C. players
Lincoln City F.C. players
Gainsborough Trinity F.C. players
Eastbourne Borough F.C. players
English Football League players